The Lamesa Farm Workers Community Historic District in Los Ybanez in Dawson County, Texas, was listed on the National Register of Historic Places in 1993.  It is a  historic district which included 32 contributing buildings.

It includes a number of farm worker houses, a number of  quadruplex shelters, a community center, a manager's house, a liquor store, a water tank, and other structures.

It is located about 1 mile north of the junction of US 87 and US 180 in Los Ybanez.

See also

National Register of Historic Places listings in Dawson County, Texas

References

Historic districts on the National Register of Historic Places in Texas
National Register of Historic Places in Dawson County, Texas
Buildings and structures completed in 1941